Tirana 4 is one of the 24 administrative units in Tirana.

Neighborhoods
Allias

References

Tirana 04